XHKL-FM is a radio station on 93.7 FM in Xalapa, Veracruz, Mexico. It is owned by Avanradio and is known as Magia.

History
XEKL-AM 550 received its concession on January 8, 1942. The first radio station in Xalapa, XEKL was owned by Carlos Ferráez Matos until 1967 and broadcast with 1,000 watts day and 250 watts night. Daytime power later increased to 5,000 watts. In 2016, Ferráez Matos was honored with a commemorative ticket issued by the National Lottery.

In 2010, XEKL was cleared to migrate to FM as XHKL-FM 93.7.

References

Radio stations in Veracruz